Yrjö Kukkapuro (born 6 April 1933) is a Finnish interior architect and furniture designer.

Education and academic career
Kukkapuro studied design at the Institute of Industrial Arts in Helsinki in the late 1950s, qualifying as an interior architect in 1958.

In the 1970s he returned to the Institute, to work as a Professor and, for two years, as the Rector.

He holds Honorary Professorships at universities including Jiangnan (Wuxi) and Nanjing, as well as an Honorary Doctorate from the University of Art and Design Helsinki (now part of the Aalto University School of Arts, Design and Architecture).

Design work

Kukkapuro's design philosophy is centred around ergonomics.

He is best known for his chairs, of which perhaps the most famous is an easy chair called Karuselli ('Carousel') from 1964, which is included in the permanent collection of major museums including the Museum of Modern Art in New York and the Victoria and Albert Museum in London. It was nominated as the most comfortable chair in the world by The New York Times in 1974, and fellow designer Sir Terence Conran has called it his "favourite place to sit because it is so comfortable".

Kukkapuro has exhibited in dozens of solo and group exhibitions around the world.

As of 2020, Kukkapuro continues to work, even in his late 80s.

Personal life
Yrjö Kukkapuro is married to graphic artist Irmeli Kukkapuro née Salminen since 1954. The couple built a home studio in Kauniainen, designed by Yrjö Kukkapuro and his long-time collaborator, engineer Eero Paloheimo.

References

External links 
 Personal website.
 Arjen designia -juttukeikalla Yrjö Kukkapuro. Yleisradio.

1933 births
Living people
Finnish designers
Aalto University School of Arts, Design and Architecture alumni
Academic staff of the Aalto University School of Arts, Design and Architecture